The men's 10,000 metres event at the 2001 Summer Universiade was held in Beijing, China on 28 August.

Results

References

Athletics at the 2001 Summer Universiade
2001